State Road 53 (SR 53) is a  north–south state highway in the panhandle of northern Florida. Its southern terminus is an interchange with Interstate 10 (I-10; which also carries the unsigned designation of SR 8) near Lee and Madison; the northern terminus is at the Georgia state line near Cherry Lake, Florida. Part of SR 53, from Harvey Greene Drive north to SR 14, is also signed SR 14 Truck, a rare special state highway in Florida.

SR 53 continues northward from the state line as State Route 333 (SR 333). A southbound continuation of SR 53 is County Road 53, which ultimately ends at an intersection with U.S. Route 27 (US 27; which also carries the unsigned designation of SR 20) in Buckville (northwest of Mayo). This is also the western terminus of CR 534.

Major intersections

References

External links

Florida Route Log (SR 53)

053
053
053
053